Vivid is the tenth Japanese language studio album (12th overall) by Japanese singer-songwriter Crystal Kay. The album served as her first release under Universal Music Japan sublabel Delicious Deli Records after Kay departed from her former record label, Epic Records Japan.

Background information
After the disappointing sales of her ninth Japanese album, Spin the Music, Kay announced that she had decided to leave Sony Music Japan who she had been signed to since the age of twelve and under which all her previous albums had been released. She moved to Delicious Deli Records under the Universal label and was working on her tenth Japanese album.
The album was preceded by three singles: "Superman", which was used in the Japanese drama Boku to Star no 99 Nichi; "Delicious na Kinyoubi / Haru Arashi"; and "Forever", which was released on June 6, 2012.

Track listing

Charts and sales

Charts

Sales

Release history

References

Crystal Kay albums
2012 albums
Universal Music Japan albums
Japanese-language albums